RTL Lounge is a Dutch pay television channel dedicated to drama and lifestyle programmes.

It is operated by RTL Nederland and launched on 2 October 2009.

Programming

Domestic
 Goede tijden, slechte tijden (reruns)

Imported
 Baywatch
 The Bold and the Beautiful
 Everybody Loves Raymond

References

External links 
Official site

RTL Nederland
Television channels in the Netherlands
Television channels and stations established in 2009